Sugar paste icing is a sweet, edible sugar dough, typically made from sucrose and glucose. It is sometimes referred to as sugar gum or gum paste.

Though the two are both used in cake decorating, sugar paste differs from fondant icing in that it hardens, rather than retaining a soft consistency, making it ideal for creating solid, sculpted decorations that can later be attached to a cake by other means. By contrast, the soft and malleable qualities of fondant icing make it softer and more ideal for covering cakes entirely.

Production
Sugar paste is produced both commercially and domestically, with commercial sugar paste holding a number of advantages that homemade sugar paste does not; commercial varieties of sugar paste can be stored for up to a year, is typically easier to manipulate and shape than homemade varieties, and can be bought in a pure-white colour, which is difficult to recreate at home.

History
Evidence for the use of sugar paste in various settings dates back to at least the 16th century.

The first sweets to go into the first Christmas crackers were made from sugar paste, and would be stamped with words and short phrases.

References

External links

Cake Decorating - how to ice a cake with sugarpaste (fondant) by Cake-Links (video)

Cake decorating
Confectionery